Swoop is a Canadian ultra low-cost carrier (ULCC) owned by WestJet. The airline is headquartered in Calgary and was named after WestJet's desire to "swoop" (or jump) into the Canadian market with a new business model. It was officially announced on September 27, 2017, and began flights on June 20, 2018.

History
In April 2017, WestJet announced that it was planning to launch a new airline to enter the growing ultra low-cost carrier (ULCC) market and compete against NewLeaf (now Flair Airlines). The airline was planned to launch in late 2017, but in August 2017 it was delayed to June 2018 after switching to a lower-cost booking system. The delay also allowed WestJet to reconfigure aircraft for Swoop over the spring 2018 season.

Swoop was officially announced on September 27, 2017, and was expected to have base fares 40% lower than WestJet's fares. It was announced that Swoop would launch with six Boeing 737-800 aircraft. Tickets first became available for sale on February 1, 2018. Following its announcement, WestJet announced that Swoop's flights would not be based in Calgary, but in another nearby market such as Edmonton, Abbotsford, Hamilton or Winnipeg. On February 1, 2018, Swoop officially began selling tickets to the public, announcing John C. Munro Hamilton International Airport as its main base and Edmonton International Airport as its western base.

On June 20, 2018, Swoop officially launched with two Boeing 737-800 aircraft in its fleet. The first flight was from John C. Munro Hamilton International Airport to Abbotsford International Airport, with passengers paying an average of $103 for the flight. Winnipeg James Armstrong Richardson International Airport, Edmonton International Airport, and Halifax Stanfield International Airport were also launch destinations. The fleet of 2 aircraft was planned to be expanded to 6 by the end of 2018 and to 10 in 2019.

On August 2, 2018, Swoop announced that it was to become the first Canadian ultra low-cost airline to fly to the United States, launching service to Las Vegas, Phoenix (Mesa), Tampa, Orlando, and Fort Lauderdale throughout the month of October 2018. However, prior to launching service in October, Swoop announced service to four more Mexican and Caribbean destinations launching in December 2018 and January 2019; Puerto Vallarta, Montego Bay, Cancun and Mazatlan. On October 20, 2018, Swoop delayed launch of its flights to the United States until October 27, 2018, due to its lack of U.S. federal approvals. Starting April and May 2019, Swoop began launching service to London and Kelowna. On June 24, 2019, Swoop announced Los Cabos as a new destination, which commenced in November 2019. On December 19, 2019, Swoop announced three new summer seasonal destinations including Victoria, Kamloops, and one U.S. destination, San Diego. On January 9, 2020, Swoop expanded its East Coast network with three new destinations to St. John's, Charlottetown, and Moncton. In October 2020, Swoop switched its eastern base to Toronto Pearson International Airport.

In February 2022, Swoop announced that it would add 6 Boeing 737 MAX aircraft to its fleet, subsequently announcing that it planned to begin operating the aircraft during June 2022.

Destinations

Swoop's route network consists of destinations across North America and the Caribbean. The airline focuses on point-to-point flying, and does not offer connections. The airline additionally has an agreement with Sunwing Travel Group that allows passengers out of Hamilton, Abbotsford, Winnipeg and Edmonton to book Sunwing vacation packages with Swoop flights.

Fleet

Current fleet 

, Swoop operates an all-Boeing 737 fleet, comprising the following aircraft:

Livery 
Swoop's fleet of aircraft are painted with the Swoop logo large across the fuselage, and a pink tail with a white line leading up to a silhouette of an aircraft. The winglets are painted in a similar pattern to the tail, pink with a white stripe through it. This pattern is the same on the inside and outside of the winglets. Each aircraft is given a name painted in pink below the windows of the cockpit on both sides of the aircraft.

Cabin

Seating
Swoop's fleet of Boeing 737 aircraft is equipped with Recaro BL3520 leather seats and pink antimacassars over the headrests, which are configured in an all-economy class configuration in a 3–3 layout. Each seat includes a tray-table, seat pocket, an adjustable headrest, and movable armrests at most seats. Each seat is also equipped with AC and USB in-seat power.

Services
As a low-cost carrier, Swoop charges additional fees for various services and amenities, including additional baggage allowances and in-flight catering. The airline offers Wi-Fi internet access through their mobile app, called "Swoop Stream". Previously, the airline offered free in-flight entertainment through Swoop Stream, which offered movies and pre-recorded television shows until March 1, 2019, after which Swoop began removing the-inflight entertainment services from its app.

References

External links

 

Airlines of Canada
2017 establishments in Alberta
Low-cost carriers
WestJet
Airlines established in 2017
Companies based in Calgary
Canadian companies established in 2017